Naft Chal (also Romanized as Naft Chāl) is a village in Bahnemir Rural District, Bahnemir District, Babolsar County, Mazandaran Province, Iran. At the 2006 census, its population was 519, in 121 families. Most of its populatìon is busy working on farms, fishing at sea, and keeping livestock.

There is a big mosque on Sahel street and also an elementary school which is open to students.

Alireza Khanpour was, of all the local council members who tried to develop this village, the most hardworking and thoughtful person. He brought order to conditions in this village.

Naftchal is a beach village.

References 

Populated places in Babolsar County